Arnar Þór Viðarsson (transliterated as Arnar Thor Vidarsson; born 15 March 1978) is an Icelandic football coach and a former player, his playing position was midfielder. He last played for Belgian Pro League side Cercle Brugge, where he was also employed as head coach. Currently he is the head coach of Iceland.

Club career
He started his career in FH, and moved to Belgium to play for Sporting Lokeren early in his career. He returned to FH for a short period, but apart from a loan spell at Lillestrøm SK and a trial at Genk, he has played for Lokeren from October 1998 until 2006. Since then, Lokeren has signed many Icelandic players, for instance midfielder Rúnar Kristinsson who holds the Icelandic record for most international caps.

In 2006, he transferred to FC Twente, where he signed a contract until 2009. For the 2007-08 he was loaned out to newly promoted De Graafschap, before eventually returning to Belgium, playing for Cercle Brugge, where he ended his career as a player in the summer of 2014, becoming assistant under head coach Lorenzo Staelens. Following the sacking of Staelens on October of that same year, Arnar was appointed head coach.

International career
Arnar was capped 52 times for Iceland, scoring 2 goals, as well as 41 times at youth level. He made his debut for the seniors in a June 1998 friendly match against South Africa.

Personal life
Arnar is the brother of fellow Icelandic midfielders Bjarni and Davíð, and the son of Icelandic footballer Viðar Halldórsson.

Managerial statistics

References

External links

Profile at VI.nl

1978 births
Living people
Arnar Vidarsson
Arnar Vidarsson
Association football midfielders
Arnar Vidarsson
K.S.C. Lokeren Oost-Vlaanderen players
Lillestrøm SK players
K.R.C. Genk players
FC Twente players
De Graafschap players
Cercle Brugge K.S.V. players
Belgian Pro League players
Eredivisie players
Eliteserien players
Arnar Vidarsson
Arnar Vidarsson
Expatriate footballers in Belgium
Expatriate footballers in the Netherlands
Expatriate footballers in Norway
Icelandic expatriate sportspeople in Belgium
Icelandic expatriate sportspeople in the Netherlands
Icelandic expatriate sportspeople in Norway
Icelandic football managers
Cercle Brugge K.S.V. managers
K.S.C. Lokeren Oost-Vlaanderen managers
Iceland national football team managers
Icelandic expatriate football managers
Expatriate football managers in Belgium